Svay Theab District is a district located in Svay Rieng Province, Cambodia. The district is subdivided into 11 khums and 86 phums. According to the 1998 census of Cambodia, it had a population of 59,650. Most people are farmers. Many villagers sent their teenage children to work in the factory in Phnom Penh.

References 

Districts of Svay Rieng province